Tristan Klingsor, birth name (Arthur Justin) Léon Leclère (born Lachapelle-aux-Pots, Oise department, 8 August 1874; died Nogent-sur-Marne, 3 August 1966), was a French poet, musician, painter and art critic, best known for his artistic association with the composer Maurice Ravel.

His pseudonym, combining the names of Wagner's hero Tristan (from Tristan und Isolde) and his (Wagner's) villain Klingsor (from Parsifal), indicates one aspect of his artistic interests, though he said that he chose the names because he liked the "sounds" they made, the associations with Arthurian and Breton legends he had read as a child, and that there were already too many literary men in Paris with the surname Leclère. Some of his "orientalist" poems are addressed to a mysterious "jeune étranger," possibly symbolising his gay orientation, although he did marry in 1903, and had a daughter two years later. His first collection, Filles-fleurs (1895), was in eleven-syllable verse. After this he often used a personal form of free verse. He was a member of the  group of French poets. Certain of his poems were set to music by composers including Charles Koechlin, Georges Hüe and Georges Migot, and he is best remembered as providing the texts for Ravel’s song cycle Shéhérazade (1903). He and Ravel belonged to the Paris avant-garde artistic group known as Les Apaches for whose meetings he was sometimes the host. He recorded his long acquaintance with the composer in an essay, "L'Époque Ravel". Ravel dedicated the first of his Trois Chansons to him in 1915.

Klingsor was also a painter (exhibiting from 1905 at the Salon d'Automne and being awarded the Prix Puvis de Chavannes in 1952). His visual art was reviewed twice by Guillaume Apollinaire: In 1906, he called Klingsor's attempts "Merde!" but in 1908, he was kinder, stating: "Klingsor animates his painting with the same sentimental delicacy that gives his poetry its somewhat contrived, dated charm. For my part, I prefer the poet to the painter.” He was also the author of several studies on art, and a composer in his own right, with several collections of melodies, four-part songs, and piano music.

List of writings

 Filles-Fleurs, poems, Mercure de France, 1895
 Squelettes fleuris, poems, Mercure de France, 1897
 L’Escarpolette, poems, Mercure de France, 1899
 La Jalousie du Vizir, story, Mercure de France, 1899
 Le Livre d'Esquisses, poems, Mercure de France, 1900
 Schéhérazade, poems, Mercure de France, 1903
 Petits métiers des rues de Paris, prose, 1904
 La Duègne apprivoisée, comedy, 1907
 Le Valet de Cœur, poems, Mercure de France, 1908
 Les caprices de Goya, critical essay, 1909
 Les Femmes de théâtre au XVIIIe siècle, 1911
 Poèmes de Bohème, poems, Mercure de France, 1913
 Hubert Robert et les paysagistes français du XVIIIe siècle, 1913
 Les derniers-états des lettres et des arts : la peinture, 1913
 Chroniques du Chaperon et de la Braguette, poems, 1913
 La Peinture (L’art français depuis vingt ans), Rieder, Paris, 1921
 Humoresques, poems, 1921
 L'Escarbille d'or, poems, Chiberre, Paris, 1922
 La Peinture (L’art français depuis vingt-cinq ans), Rieder, Paris, 1922
 Cézanne, Rieder, Paris, 1923
 Chardin, collection Maîtres Anciens et Modernes, Nilsson, Paris, 1924
 Essai sur le chapeau, Les Cahiers de Paris, 1926
 Léonard de Vinci (Maîtres de l'art ancien), Rieder, Paris, 1930
 Poèmes du Brugnon, 1933
 Mesures pour rien, in Poésie 42, 1942
 Cinquante Sonnets du Dormeur éveillé, 1949
 Florilège poétique, poems selected by Georges Bouquet and Pierre Menanteau, L’Amitié par le livre, Blainville-sur-Mer, 1955
 Album, 1955
 Claude Lepape, 1958
 Le Tambour voilé, Mercure de France, 1960
 Second florilège, with illustrations by the poet, 1964
 Maisons Aloysius, 1964
 L’Art de peindre, collection Initiations, Braun, Paris
 Poèmes de la princesse Chou, 1974

References

Further reading

External links
 
 
 
 Tristan Klingsor Papers. General Collection, Beinecke Rare Book and Manuscript Library[, Yale University.

1874 births
1966 deaths
People from Oise
Writers from Hauts-de-France
French poets
19th-century French painters
French male painters
20th-century French painters
20th-century French male artists
French musicians
French LGBT musicians
French LGBT poets
French male poets
19th-century French male artists